St Leonards School is a private boarding and day school for pupils aged 4–19 in St Andrews, Fife, Scotland. Founded in 1877 as St Andrews School for Girls Company, it adopted the St Leonards name upon moving to its current premises, the site formerly occupied by the University of St Andrews’ St Leonard's College, in 1883.

The school emerged from the  St Andrews Ladies' Educational Association which was established in 1868. One of the school's founders  was  Lewis Campbell,  chairman of the college council for many years and  a Classics professor at St Andrews University who advocated for higher education for women. Consequently, from its earliest days, the college's senior students  were encouraged to prepare to  matriculate and enjoyed  close links with various  courses offered  at the University of St Andrews; in 1892, the Fifeshire Journal asked its readers: "Who is to enjoy the proud distinction of being the first matriculated girl-student of St Andrews?" St Leonards remained an all-girls school until 1999, upon which it became fully co-educational. As an IB World School, St Leonards offers the International Baccalaureate's Primary Years, Middle Years, Career-related and Diploma programmes alongside the English-system GCSE/IGCSE. It is the only school in Scotland to teach an IB curriculum throughout.

History
The school was established in 1877 by the St Andrews School for Girls Company whose  Articles of Association were drawn up on the  lines of Bristol's Clifton College,  the public school for boys. The school's administrative and commercial  ventures  utilised the company's name until at least 1894. Madeline Daniell, the educationalist and campaigner for women's right to higher education, was one of two founding secretaries of the Company.

Dame Louisa Lumsden was appointed the School's first Headmistress in 1877. The belief of the school was that "a girl should receive an education that is as good as her brother's, if not better" and Lumsden was "determined to establish a veritable Eton for girls". Although her role as principal  ended in 1882, her connection to the school remained strong for "forty-five years": During her time as a member of  staff of the  University of St Andrews' University Hall and in the years after, "Miss Lumsden  returned many times to  St Leonards to give lectures".

The school was, until 1894, operating primarily  as a senior school, the  junior school remaining informally structured  until after that date.

In 1884, ground was  feued [granted]  from the University of St Andrews to  the school which had  also commenced the lease of a  field from the university for recreational use. In 1894, Old Tom Morris laid out a 9 hole golf course  for the girls at St Leonards.

To ensure that the teaching of Chemistry to the girls at the school was rigorous, in 1885, Dame Frances Dove, the  principal, employed Thomas Purdie, Professor of Chemistry at  St Andrews University as an external examiner for the school's senior students. From its earliest decades, the  school's sixth formers "had the pleasure of attending lectures" in various subjects including  Political Economy and  Music at the University of St Andrews whilst  others attended  the university's  Gifford Lectures.

In 1999, St Leonards Sixth Form and St Katharines Prep School opened their doors to boys for the first time; the school soon became completely co-educational.

St Katharines and St Leonards-New Park

St Katharines School was the original prep school of St Leonards, making full use of the campus and facilities while retaining a degree of autonomy. In March 2002 it was announced that the prep school would be relocated to the main building and renamed St Leonards Junior and Middle Schools. Following a further announcement in March 2005, St Leonards Junior and Middle schools merged with New Park School, also located in St Andrews, operating as one unit under the name St Leonards-New Park. In June 2011 it was announced that the Junior School would be known in future as St Leonards Junior School. At the same time, work commenced on a £2.5m redevelopment of the junior school. Today, St Leonards is an all-through, coeducational school, from Year 1 through to Year 13.

Lacrosse 
The school is believed to be the first place in the world to have played women's lacrosse after it was introduced by Louisa Lumsden in 1890.

St Leonard's Chapel
Situated in the grounds of the school is St Leonard's Chapel,  owned by the University of St Andrews. Regulations outlined by the University of St Andrews stipulate that "funerals for both  alumni of  the  university and members or former members of St Leonards School may take place in the university's St Leonard's Chapel".

Academics 
At St Leonards, year groups are named following the system used in England and Wales (Year 1 to Year 13). Years 1–7 form the Junior School, Years 8–11 the Senior School and Years 12–13 the Sixth Form.

The IB's Primary Years Programme (PYP) is taught from Years 1–6, while the IB's Middle Years Programme (MYP) is introduced in Year 7 and continues through Year 9. Therefore, the MYP overlaps across the Junior and Senior years.

In Year 10, pupils begin a two-year course in preparation for their GCSE/IGCSE exams at the end of Year 11. Students are given a degree of choice as to which subjects they take, however a number remain compulsory: English, Maths, Science and a foreign language.

As an alternative to the above for pupils who join the school in Year 11, St Leonards offers a one-year Pre-IB course. These students sit IGCSE exams only.

In Years 12–13, St Leonards pupils may undertake one of two programmes: the IB Diploma Programme (DP) or the IB Career-related Programme (CP). A large majority choose the DP, with the latter being available for those who would prefer a more vocational qualification. Academic study is still very present for CP students alongside the practical aspect, as this programme incorporates at least two DP courses.

The average IB Diploma points score for St Leonards pupils from 2015 to 2019 is 33/45, compared to a global average of 29/45 points for the same period. St Leonards has been recognised as the "Top Independent Secondary School Sixth Form in Scotland for IB/A Level Results" in 2016, 2017 and 2018. In 2019, St Leonards was named "Top Independent Secondary School in Scotland" by The Sunday Times Parent Power guide.

Almost all St Leonards graduates go on to university. Approximately one third of the graduating class studies in Scotland, one third studies elsewhere in the United Kingdom and the remaining third studies overseas.

Headmistresses and headmasters
For the first 124 years, (when the school was an all-girls school) the Head of St Leonards was always a woman. The first Headmaster was appointed in 2003.
 1877–1882: Dame Louisa Lumsden
 1882–1896: Dame Frances Dove
 1896–1907: Julia Mary Grant
 1907–1921: Mary Bentinck-Smith
 1922–1938: Katharine Howard McCutcheon
 1938–1955: Janet A. Macfarlane
 1956–1970: Janet S. A. Macaulay
 1970–1987: Martha Hamilton (Mrs R Steedman)
 1988–2000: Mary James 
 2001–2003: Wendy Bellars 
 2003–2008: Robert A. J. Tims
 2008 – April 2021: Michael Carslaw 
April 2021 – August 2021: Dawn Pemberton-Hislop (Acting Headmistress) 
From August 2021: Simon Brian

Fees 
School fees at St Leonards for the 2020–2021 academic year ranged from £9,552 to £15,474 for day pupils and £24,651 to £37,452 for boarders. These fees include tuition, lodging for boarders, meals (lunch for day pupils, full-board for boarders) as well some textbooks and the majority of extra-curricular activities. However, there are some additional extras not included and charged at a supplementary rate.

The school does offer financial assistance to a limited number of Senior and Sixth Form pupils who demonstrate sufficient financial need – covering up to 100% of fees. While St Leonards does award scholarships to pupils who've demonstrated excellence in a variety of fields, the scholarship is based on merit and does not result in a reduction of fees.

St Leonards Seniors 
Former St Leonards pupils are known as St Leonards Seniors, as is the style at the sister institutions of Wycombe Abbey and Benenden School. St Leonards organises various reunions and events for Seniors in St Andrews and select cities around the world, while also providing online networking tools.

Notable St Leonards Seniors 
 Betty Archdale – early barrister; pioneer of women's education in Australia
 Helen Archdale – feminist, suffragist and journalist
 Elspeth Barker – author of "O, Caledonia!", formerly married to poet George Barker
 Wilhelmina Barns-Graham – leading abstract painter, based in St Ives, Cornwall
 Hilda Bruce – zoologist, discoverer of the Bruce effect
 Hazel Byford, Baroness Byford DBE – Shadow Minister for Food and Rural Affairs
 Jean Hunter Cowan – artist
 Jackie Forster (Jacqueline Moir Mackenzie) – actress, TV personality, feminist and lesbian campaigner
 Louisa Garrett Anderson – medical pioneer, social reformer, suffragist
 Fiona Gaunt – television actor, mother of Genevieve Gaunt
 Elizabeth Girling – Spanish Civil War veteran, political activist and charity campaigner
 Kitty McKane Godfree – Wimbledon Ladies' Singles Champion, 1924 and 1926
 Margaret Haig Thomas (Lady Rhondda) – founder of political magazine Time and Tide
 Betty Harvie Anderson (Baroness Skrimshire) – Conservative politician and peer
 Anji Hunter – former Director of Government Relations, 10 Downing Street
 Christina Keith (1889–1963) – academic and author
 Kristin Linklater – vocal coach to many well-known actors, based at Columbia University
 Anne Macaulay (née Russell) – musicologist, antiquarian and author 
 Chrystal Macmillan – barrister, feminist and pacifist
 Catherine Marshall – suffragist and pacifist
 Elizabeth Mavor – writer
 Anna McElligott – musician
 Max McElligott – lead singer of Wolf Gang
 Kathleen Ollerenshaw DBE – mathematician and educationalist
 Tessa Ransford – founder of the Scottish Poetry Library
 Louise Robey – actress, singer, model
 Rosabelle Sinclair – honoured in U.S. Lacrosse Hall of Fame, Baltimore
 Dr. Alice Stewart (née Naish) – pioneering epidemiologist
 Josephine Stewart Leading sports person, early Lacrosse and lifer at St Leonards
 Stella Tennant – supermodel
 Penny Thomson – film producer and former Director of Edinburgh International Film Festival
 Fiona Watson – UN official killed in the Canal Hotel bombing, Baghdad
 Audrey Withers – editor of Vogue from 1940 to 1960

See also

St Leonard's College

References

External links 

 
Education Scotland: St Leonards School
Good Schools Guide: St Leonards School
Tatler Schools Guide: St Leonards School

Boarding schools in Fife
Charities based in Scotland
Education in St Andrews
Educational institutions established in 1877
Private schools in Fife
International Baccalaureate schools in Scotland
Member schools of the Headmasters' and Headmistresses' Conference
Primary schools in Fife
Secondary schools in Fife
Women's lacrosse
1877 establishments in Scotland